Big Woods State Forest is a  state forest in Sussex County, Virginia. It was the first state forest property to be established in southeast Virginia.

History
The property, previously used for timber production by International Paper, was acquired by the Virginia Department of Forestry (VDOF) in 2010. It was part of a $6.4 million purchase of  undertaken by VDOF and the Virginia Department of Game and Inland Fisheries (VDGIF); the remainder of the purchased property was used to create Big Woods Wildlife Management Area, located immediately adjacent Big Woods State Forest and managed by VDGIF.

Description
Big Woods State Forest covers a landscape typified by pine savanna; it contains primarily loblolly pine from its days as a timber plantation, and newer plantings of longleaf pine. Wildlife on the property include deer, wild turkey, bobcat, fox, coyote, and rabbit.

The state forest borders both the Big Woods Wildlife Management Area and The Nature Conservancy's Piney Grove Preserve, a  property dedicated to restoring longleaf pine forest for the benefit of the endangered red-cockaded woodpecker. Management of both the state forest and wildlife management area aims to promote the survival of the red-cockaded woodpecker through the planting of longleaf pine and the installation of nest boxes.

Hunting, fishing, horseback riding, and hiking is permitted within Big Woods State Forest; all activities except hiking require visitors to possess a valid State Forest Use Permit.

See also
 List of Virginia state forests
 List of Virginia state parks

References

External links

Virginia Department of Forestry: Big Woods State Forest

Virginia state forests
Protected areas of Sussex County, Virginia
2010 establishments in Virginia
Protected areas established in 2010